Michael Damian Thomas is an American magazine editor and podcaster. Thomas has won seven Hugo Awards, a British Fantasy Award, and a Parsec Award as co-publisher and co-editor-in-chief of Uncanny Magazine with his wife, Lynne M. Thomas. He has also been active as an advocate for disabled children in Illinois.

Early life 
Thomas attended the Illinois Mathematics and Science Academy (IMSA), a public magnet school in Aurora, Illinois, in 1992. In 2018, IMSA gave him the Alumni Titan Award, recognizing his contributions as "an enthusiastic and energetic champion who has invested significantly in the IMSA community". He graduated from Parkland College in 1998, and worked on the Parkland literary journal.

Career 
Thomas was managing editor at Apex Magazine from 2012 until 2013, and an associate editor at Mad Norwegian Press. In 2014, he and Lynne M. Thomas began Uncanny Magazine, as "a home for emotional, strongly written, experimental stories and provocative nonfiction" and poetry. He is co-host of the podcast of the same name, and has contributed to other podcasts, including the SF Squeecast with Elizabeth Bear, Paul Cornell, Seanan McGuire, and Catherynne M. Valente, and Down and Safe, a Blake’s 7 podcast with Amal El-Mohtar, Scott Lynch, and L. M. Myles. 

Thomas has been the co-editor of several collections of stories and essays, including Glitter & Mayhem (2013 with John Klima and Lynne M. Thomas), and Queers Dig Time Lords: A Celebration of Doctor Who by the LGBTQ Fans Who Love It (2014, with Sigrid Ellis), and The Best of Uncanny (2019, with Lynne M. Thomas).

Thomas has taken a particular interest in disability issues. He chaired the City of DeKalb Advisory Commission on Disabilities and the DeKalb County Local Interagency Networking Council, and served on the planning committee of the Aicardi Syndrome Family Conference. In 2017, the Thomases and Mary Robinette Kowal crafted the "SF/F Convention Accessibility Pledge", a list of three basic accessibility requirements for signers' participation in conventions as participants, panelists, or guests. In 2018 and 2019, Uncanny Magazine published the theme issues Disabled People Destroy Science Fiction and Disabled People Destroy Fantasy, exclusively featuring the works of disabled editors and authors.

Bibliography
 with Sigrid Ellis (editors), Queers Dig Time Lords: A Celebration of Doctor Who by the LGBTQ Fans Who Love It (Mad Norwegian Press, 2013). 
 with John Klima and Lynne M. Thomas (editors), Glitter & Mayhem (Apex Publications, 2013). 
 with Catherynne M. Valente, Seanan McGuire and Elizabeth Bear, Harvest Season: An Anthology by the SF Squeecast (ISFiC Press, 2014). 
 with Lynne M. Thomas (editors), The Best of Uncanny (Subterranean Press, 2019).

Awards 
Thomas has been nominated for multiple Hugo Awards between 2013 and 2020, for work on Apex Magazine, Uncanny Magazine, and the anthology Queers Dig Time Lords (2014). He has been nominated for the World Fantasy Award seven times, and for Locus Awards six times.

Awards won by Michael Damian Thomas include the following:

 2016 Hugo Award for Best Semiprozine: Uncanny Magazine (with Lynne M. Thomas, Michi Trota, Erika Ensign, and Steven Schapansky)
 2016 Parsec Award for Best Speculative Fiction Magazine or Anthology Podcast: The Uncanny Magazine Podcast (with Lynne M. Thomas, Erika Ensign, Amal El-Mohtar, C. S. E. Cooney, Deborah Stanish, and Steven Schapansky)
 2017 Hugo Award for Best Semiprozine: Uncanny Magazine (with Lynne M. Thomas, Michi Trota, Julia Rios, Erika Ensign, and Steven Schapansky)
 2018 Hugo Award for Best Semiprozine: Uncanny Magazine (with Lynne M. Thomas, Michi Trota, Julia Rios, Erika Ensign, and Steven Schapansky).
 2018 Hugo Award for Best Editor Short Form (with Lynne M. Thomas)
 2019 Hugo Award for Best Semiprozine: Uncanny Magazine (with Lynne M. Thomas, Michi Trota, Erika Ensign, Steven Schapansky, Elsa Sjunneson-Henry, and Dominik Parisien)
 2019 British Fantasy Award for Best Magazine / Periodical (with Lynne M. Thomas, Michi Trota, Erika Ensign, Steven Schapansky, Elsa Sjunneson-Henry, and Dominik Parisien)
 2020 Hugo Award for Best Semiprozine: Uncanny Magazine (with Lynne M. Thomas, Michi Trota, Chimedum Ohaegbu, Erika Ensign, Steven Schapansky)
 2022 Hugo Award for Best Semiprozine: Uncanny Magazine (with Lynne M. Thomas, Chimedum Ohaegbu, Elsa Sjunneson, Erika Ensign, Steven Schapansky)

Personal life 
Since 2017, the Thomases have lived in Urbana, Illinois with their daughter Caitlin, who has Aicardi syndrome.

References

External links 
 The Official Website of Michael Damian Thomas (official website)
 Uncanny Magazine, Thomas's current Science Fiction and Fantasy Magazine
 SF Squeecast, Thomas's podcast.
 Down and Safe, a Blake’s 7 podcast, Thomas's other podcast.
 Jason Sandford, "Interview with Lynne M. Thomas and Michael Damian Thomas of Uncanny Magazine" (January 3, 2020), a blog interview with the Thomases

American editors
Science fiction editors
Hugo Award-winning editors
American podcasters
People from Illinois
Living people
Year of birth missing (living people)